The 2012 All-Ireland Under 21 Football Championship is an inter county football competition between all 32 counties in Ireland. Four competitions are contested in each province and the winners of each provincial championship enters the all-Ireland series. There are currently 2 county teams still competing for the 2012 all-Ireland Under 21 championship, Dublin and Roscommon.

Leinster Under 21 Championship

Round 1

Quarter-finals

Semi-final

Final

Munster Under 21 Championship

Quarter-finals

Semi-finals

Final

Connacht Under 21 Championship

Preliminary round

Semi-final

Final

Ulster Under 21 Championship

Round 1

Quarter-finals

Semi-finals

Final

All-Ireland Series

Semi-finals

Final

References

External links
 Official website

All-Ireland Under-21 Football Championships
All-Ireland Under 21 Football Championship